The 2019–20 Montenegrin First League was the 14th season of the top-tier association football in Montenegro. The season began on 3 August 2019 and ended on 30 June 2020. The league winners qualified for a place in the 2020–21 UEFA Champions League.

Sutjeska were the defending champions after winning the league in the previous season. The season was suspended on 13 March 2020 due to COVID-19 pandemic in Montenegro, then later resumed on 1 June 2020.

Teams
Mornar and Lovćen were relegated at the end of the previous season. After earning promotion from the Montenegrin Second League, FK Podgorica and Kom competed in the league this season.
The following 10 clubs competed in 2019–20 First League.

League table

Results
Clubs were originally scheduled to play each other four times for a total of 36 matches each.

First half of season

Second half of season

Relegation play-offs
The 10th-placed team (against the 3rd-placed team of the Second League) and the 11th-placed team (against the runners-up of the Second League) will both compete in two-legged relegation play-offs after the end of the season.

Summary

|}

Matches

Jezero won 3–2 on aggregate.

1–1 on aggregate. OFK Titograd won on penalties.

Top scorers

See also 
 Montenegrin First League

References

External links 
 UEFA
 FSCG

Montenegrin First League seasons
Monte
Montenegro
1